Andrew George Jr. is a Canadian chef and writer.

Biography
George was born in Smithers, British Columbia which is located in north central British Columbia. He grew up in Telkwa, British Columbia.

George is the third eldest of six children; George's family lived in a very small four room house with no indoor plumbing or running water. Life was simple, George can always remember his parents taking the children out to the traditional territories of the Wet'suwet'en people. In the spring George's family would harvest trout and set trap lines. In the summer his family would harvest salmon and smoke and can them for the winter, later in the summer they would get several different species of berries for home use or for Potlatch ceremony. In the fall they would hunt moose, deer and would dry, can or freeze them for the winter. In the winter George would snare rabbits and assist his father on his trap line and go ice fishing.

George attended Smithers Senior Secondary School and graduated in the 1980s.

In 1983 George was accepted into Vancouver Vocational Institute for cook training in core/short order, institutional and camp cooking and finally the A la carte program. Andrew graduated in 1985 with a B average and achieved certificates in all three courses.

George took his apprenticeship programs through British Columbia Institute of Technology (B.C.I.T.) completing in the fall of 1989 with certificates of qualifications in cooking and continued his chef training in various hotels and restaurants in the Greater Vancouver area.

During high school summer breaks George would do camp cooking for the local mining companies. George's first job in the city was at the Vancouver Indian Friendship Centre in 1985, where he was a part-time short order cook for the weekend shift.  George's first full-time job was at the Quillicum Restaurant in Vancouver, British Columbia, where he learned how to cook on a wood-burning grill and prepare other Native cuisine dishes.  At the age of 23 George became the head grill cook for the First Nations Restaurant at the Folk Life Pavilion at the World Exposition in Vancouver (Expo 86). After Expo 86 George continued his Chef's apprenticeship at Avenue Grill in Kerrisdale on Vancouver's west side and completed his training at Isadora's Restaurant on Granville Island in 1989.

George worked at Dempsey's Restaurant located at the Pacific Centre in Downtown Vancouver. He then relocated to Whistler to work at the Chateau Whistler Resort and then back to Vancouver to the Four Season's Hotel before opening his own business in Vancouver as Toody Ni Restaurant and Catering Company specializing in Northwest coast style First Nations cuisine.

In the fall of 1991 George was a representative for the First Nations of Canada with four other chefs to participate in the World Culinary Olympics held in Frankfurt, Germany in October 1992. The team was known as the Native Canadian Haute Cuisine Team, the other members were:
 David Wolfman of Toronto
 Bertha Skye from Six nations in southern Ontario
 Arnold Olson from Saskatchewan
 Brian Sappier from New Brunswick

George and the rest of the team members trained in Toronto at the Sutton Place Hotel in 1991–1992. 13,000 chefs from over 54 countries competed in the event.

In 1993 George moved to his mother's home town of Burns Lake, British Columbia after closing his restaurant.

It was there that George decided to choose a different career path. From 1994 through 1998 Andrew accepted a position with the Canadian Ministry of Forests in Burns Lake.  The position was the Aboriginal Liaison officer responsible for referral and consultation which included building relationships between the local First Nations and governments and industry as well as dealing with native issues pertaining to forestry practices.

During this time George also took on a part-time contract in Montréal Quebec 1995 through 1997 with Oudeheeman/Medina foods to teach the native Culinary Arts Program at the I.T.H.Q. (Hotel and Hospitality College) for six weeks every six months.  The students were from Native owned lodges all across Canada that were interested in using native foods on their menus. The lodges also wanted to have their own local native chefs prepare meals with their local products.

In the fall of 1996 George went to Germany with Tom Jackson's Indian Summer Festival sponsored by the Canadian Tourism Commission and Tourism Canada where they did concerts, fashion shows, pow-wows and banquets in five different cities in Germany.

In 1997 George co-authored a cookbook called FEAST - Canadian Native Cuisine for all Seasons. The book was designed around the Wet'suwet'en people and George's traditions. The book was published by Doubleday. The book is widely used by chefs in large hotels and restaurants in Canada that want to produce traditional native cuisine for their restaurants.

On September 28, 1998, George started work at the Office of the Wet'suwet'en (Treaty Office) in Smithers, British Columbia in Forestry related matters. He remained in this position until 2005.

During his time at the office of the Wet'suwet'en George had sat on various boards. These included Aboriginal Tourism British Columbia (A.T.B.C.), the Burns Lake Community Forest Board (Blcomfor), the Morice Forest District Lands and Resources Management Planning Board (L.R.M.P.) and the Bulkley Valley Community Forests Board (Bvcomfor). He was also a regional instructor for Simon Fraser University (S.F.U.) in community economics.

George was head chef at the Four Host First Nations pavilion at the 2010 Winter Olympics.

Books 
 George Jr., Andrew Feast! : Canadian native cuisine for all seasons (1997) 
 George Jr., Andrew A Feast for All Seasons: Traditional Native Peoples' Cuisine (2010) 
 George Jr., Andrew Modern Native Feasts: Healthy, Innovative, Sustainable Cuisine (2013)

Sources
Montreal Gazette article on George and his writings

Canadian male chefs
20th-century First Nations writers
Living people
British Columbia Institute of Technology alumni
People from Smithers, British Columbia
Writers from British Columbia
21st-century First Nations writers
Year of birth missing (living people)
Canadian restaurateurs